The Ordnance QF 13-pounder Mk IV anti-aircraft gun was an Elswick Ordnance commercial 3 inch 13-pounder gun of which 6 were supplied during World War I. It is unrelated to other British Mks of 13-pounder.

History

Elswick Ordnance had already developed the gun as a commercial venture and supplied the existing 6 guns to the British government in 1915 when the need for anti-aircraft guns became urgent. All 6 were eventually sent to the Western Front and then various other theatres. Precise theatres of service are difficult to ascertain due to writers often not differentiating between various Mks of 13-pounder guns. 2 guns are known to have been operated by 99th Anti-Aircraft Section at Salonika from July 1917 until the end of the war.

It is visibly identified by having 2 recoil/recuperator cylinders above the barrel. The cylinder immediately above the barrel is slightly shorter than the barrel, and the top cylinder is slightly longer than the barrel. The overall appearance is of a standard 13-pounder with an additional, slightly longer, recuperator cylinder on top. The gun breech also differed from standard British practise, in that it used a Nordenfelt breech similar to that of the French 75, but inverted : the breech was opened and closed by rotating it about an axis near the top of the barrel, which uncovered and covered the slot for entering the cartridge, rather than unscrewing and swinging it out as with the typical British Welin or Asbury breech.

Notes

See also 
List of anti-aircraft guns

References
I.V. Hogg & L.F. Thurston, British Artillery Weapons & Ammunition 1914–1918. London:Ian Allan, 1972.
Brigadier NW Routledge, History of the Royal Regiment of Artillery. Anti-Aircraft Artillery, 1914-55. London: Brassey's, 1994

Surviving examples

External links

World War I artillery of the United Kingdom
World War I anti-aircraft guns
76 mm artillery